Sandrine Kiberlain (born Sandrine Kiberlajn; 25 February 1968) is a French actress and singer. Her most notable roles were in the films The Patriots (1994), A Self Made Hero (1996), For Sale (1998), Alias Betty (2001), Mademoiselle Chambon (2009), 9 Month Stretch (2013), and Number One Fan (2014). Kiberlain has appeared in over sixty films and won two César Awards from eight nominations.

In 2021, she made her directorial debut with the drama film A Radiant Girl.

Career
Kiberlain attended Cours Florent 1987–1989 and French National Academy of Dramatic Arts 1989–1992.

Kiberlain received the Prix Romy Schneider in 1995. In addition to her acting career, she also has recorded an album (Manquait plus qu'ça, released in 2005), which was well received in France. Her second album Coupés bien net et bien carré was released in October 2007.

Personal life
Kiberlain married actor Vincent Lindon in 1998, with whom she has a daughter, Suzanne, born in 2000. The couple met in 1993 on the set of the film L'Irrésolu (1994). They separated in 2003.

On March 5, 2015, Kiberlain appeared on the cover of Paris Match, with Édouard Baer.

Philanthropy
Kiberlain has been a member of the Les Enfoirés charity ensemble since 1997.

Filmography

Discography

Albums
 Manquait plus qu'ça (2005)
 Coupés bien net et bien carré (2007)

Singles

As main artist
 La Chanteuse (2007)

As featured artist
 Vole (2016) (charity single with Carla Bruni, Nolwenn Leroy, Laurent Voulzy...)

References

External links

 

1968 births
Living people
Jewish French actresses
French film actresses
French television actresses
French people of Polish-Jewish descent
People from Boulogne-Billancourt
Knights of the Ordre national du Mérite
Cours Florent alumni
20th-century French actresses
21st-century French actresses
French women singers
Best Actress César Award winners
Most Promising Actress César Award winners